Campydelta is a genus of moths of the family Noctuidae. The genus was erected by Emilio Berio in 1964.

Species
Campydelta campyla (Hampson, 1909) Sierra Leone, Ivory Coast, Ghana, Zaire, Malawi, Tanzania, Zambia, Zimbabwe
Campydelta phoenicraspis (Hampson, 1910) Zaire, Zambia, Zimbabwe
Campydelta stolifera (Saalmüller, 1891) Madagascar

References

External links

Hadenini